The 1960 NAIA World Series was the fourth annual tournament hosted by the National Association of Intercollegiate Athletics to determine the national champion of baseball among its member colleges and universities in the United States and Canada.

The tournament was played at Soos Park in Sioux City, Iowa.

Whitworth (20-8) defeated Georgia Southern (21-11) in the championship series, 4–0, to win the Pirates' first NAIA World Series.

Washburn pitcher, and future MLB player and two-time World Series champion with the St. Louis Cardinals, Ray Washburn was named tournament MVP.

Bracket

See also
 1960 NCAA University Division baseball tournament

Reference

NAIA World Series
NAIA World Series
NAIA World Series